Il Giornalino is an Italian comics magazine published in Italy.

History and profile
Il Giornalino was founded by the Catholic publisher Edizioni San Paolo of Alba in 1924.

During its history, the magazine has published the Italian translation of numerous American and European comics series, such as Looney Tunes, The Smurfs, Lucky Luke, Popeye, Iznogoud, Hanna-Barbera's characters, Asterix and the Teenage Mutant Ninja Turtles. It also featured adaptations of famous novel and literary works, including The Betrothed, Robinson Crusoe, Gargantua and Pantagruel, Hamlet and others.

Original characters published on the pages of Il Giornalino include Capitan Erik, Commissario Spada, Dodo & Cocco, Jack Speed, Larry Yuma, Micromino, Nicoletta, Petra Chérie, Piccolo Dente, Pinky, and Rosco & Sonny.

Authors who worked for Il Giornalino include Dino Battaglia, Carlo Peroni, Benito Jacovitti, Attilio Micheluzzi,  Ferdinando Tacconi, Luciano Bottaro, Franco Caprioli, Sergio Toppi, Tiziano Sclavi, Giorgio Cavazzano, Alfredo Castelli, Lino Landolfi, Daniele Panebarco, Massimo Mattioli, Sergio Zaniboni.

See also
List of magazines published in Italy

References

1924 establishments in Italy
Children's magazines published in Italy
Comics magazines published in Italy
Italian comics titles
Magazines established in 1924
1924 comics debuts
Youth magazines
Magazines published in Milan